This list of Indian poets consists of poets of Indian ethnic, cultural or religious ancestry either born in India or emigrated to India from other regions of the world.

Assamese

 Amulya Barua (1922–1946), first published posthumously in 1964
 Atul Chandra Hazarika (1903–1986), poet, dramatist, children's story writer and translator
 Parvati Prasad Baruva (1904-1964), lyricist, poet and filmmaker
 Bhabananda Deka (born 1929), writer, poet, critic, columnist, playwright
 Ganesh Gogoi (born 1907–1938)
 Hem Barua (1915–1977), poet and politician
 Lakshminath Bezbarua, a doyen of Assamese literature
 Chandra Kumar Agarwala, Romantic poet
 Hemchandra Goswami, Romantic poet
 Ambikagiri Raichoudhury, Romantic poet
 Hiren Bhattacharya (1932–2012), writer, poet, critic, columnist and editor
 Homen Borgohain (1932–2021), writer, poet, critic, columnist and editor
 Indira Goswami (1942-2011), Jnanapith Award winner, poet, editor and academician
 Jyoti Prasad Agarwala (1903–1953), playwright, songwriter, poet, writer and film maker
 Bishnu Prasad Rabha (KolaGuru)
 Nabakanta Barua, also known as Ekhud Kokaideu (1926–2002), novelist and poet
 Nilmani Phookan (born 1933)
 Harekrishna Deka (born 1942), poet, fiction writer, and critic
 Mahim Bora (born 1930), poet, fiction writer
 Santana Tanty (born 1952), poet

Bengali

Bengali language names in parentheses

Abul Bashar (born 1951), poet and writer
Annadashankar Roy (1905–2002)
Bharatchandra Ray (1712–1760), Raygunakar, Shakta court poet and song writer in Krishnanagar
Binoy Majumdar (1934–2006), Indian poet
Bishnu Dey (1909–1982), poet, prose writer, movie critic
Buddhadeb Basu (also spelled "Buddhadeva Bose") (1908–1974), poet, novelist, short-story writer and essayist
Chandidas (born 1408 CE), refers to (possibly more than one) medieval poet
Dwijendralal Ray (1863–1913), poet, playwright, and musician, known primarily for patriotic plays and songs, as well as Hindu devotional lyrics
Girindramohini Dasi (1858–1924), 19th century poet
Govindadasa, Medieval Vaishanavite poet
Humayun Kabir (1906–1969), poet, educationalist, politician, writer, philosopher
Iswarchandra Gupta (1812–1859), poet and writer
Jatindramohan Bagchi (1878–1948)
Jatindranath Sengupta (1887–1954), poet and writer
Jibanananda Das (1899–1954)
Joy Goswami (born 1954), Indian poet
Kazi Nazrul Islam (also spelled "Kazi Nozrul Islam") (1899–1976), poet, musician, revolutionary, and philosopher
Krittibas Ojha (also spelled "Krittivas Ojha"), medieval poet
Malay Roy Choudhury (born 1939), founder of the Hungry generation movement
Mallika Sengupta (born 1960), poet and writer
Mandakranta Sen (born 1972), feminist poet, youngest winner of Ananda Puraskar and Sahitya Akademi Golden Jubilee award
Michael Madhusudan Dutta (also spelled "Maikel Modhushudôn Dôtto" and "Datta") (1824–1873), born Madhusudan Dutt, poet and dramatist
Nabaneeta Dev Sen (Nôbonita Deb Shen) (born 1938), writer and poet
Nabinchandra Sen (1847–1909), poet and writer
Premendra Mitra (1904–1988), poet, novelist, short-story writer, including thrillers and science fiction
Prabhat Ranjan Sarkar (1921–1990), known for Prabhat Samgiita   
Purnendu Patri (born 1930), poet, novelist, artist and film maker
Rabindranath Tagore (1861–1941), Indian poet who won the 1913 Nobel Prize in Literature
Ramprasad Sen (1718–1775), Shakta court poet
Shankha Ghosh (1932–2021), poet and critic
Shivadasa Sen (born 14th century)
Samir Roychoudhury (1933–2016), post-modern poet, short story writer, critic and editor
Subhash Mukhopadhyay (Shubhash Mukhopaddhae) (1919–2003)
Subhro Bandopadhyay (born 1978), poet 
Subodh Sarkar (born 1958), poet
Sudhindranath Dutta
Sukanta Bhattacharya (1926–1947), poet
Sukumar Ray (1887–1923), humorous poet, short-story writer and playwright
Sunil Gangopadhyay (Shunil Gônggopaddhae) (born 1934), Indian poet, novelist
Syed Kawsar Jamal (born 1950), Indian poet and essayist
Tarapada Roy (1936–2007), poet, essayist and short-story writer, short stories, and essays, humourist

Indian poets writing in English
In alphabetical order by first name:

 A. J. Thomas (born 1952), poet, editor
 A. K. Ramanujan (1929–1993), poet and scholar of Indian literature who wrote in both English and Kannada
 Abhay K (born 1980), poet, diplomat, writer, author and artist
 Agha Shahid Ali (1949–2001), Kashmiri-American poet writing in English
 Amit Chaudhuri (born 1962), author and poet writing in English
Amitabh Mitra poet, artist and emergency medicine physician
 Anuradha Bhattacharyya (born 1975), author and poet writing in English
 Amol Redij (born 1977), English poet and writer
 Arun Kolatkar (1932–2004), poet writings in English and Marathi
 Arundhathi Subramaniam, poet and writer and web editor writing in English
 Arvind Krishna Mehrotra (born 1947), poet, anthologist, literary critic and translator writing in English
 Bibhu Padhi (born 1951), poet, translator and critic writing in English
 C. P. Surendran (born 1958), poet, novelist and editor writing in English
 D. C. Chambial, poet, editor and critic
 Eunice De Souza (also "Eunice de Souza" (born 1940)), poet, literary critic and novelist writing in English
 Feroze Varun Gandhi (born 1980), poet, politician and columnist
 Fredoon Kabraji (1897–1986), poet, writer, journalist, and artist writing in English
 G. S. Sharat Chandra (1935–2000), author and poet writing in English
 Gieve Patel (born 1940), poet, playwright, painter and a practising general physician
 Gopi Kottoor (born 1956), internationally acclaimed poet, playwright and translator
 Hemant Mohapatra, poet writing in English
 Henry Louis Vivian Derozio (1809–1831), Indian poet
 Jagannath Prasad Das (born 1936), also known as J P Das, award-winning poet in English and Oriya
 Jayanta Mahapatra (born 1928), internationally acclaimed poet, winner of Padma Shri and first ever Sahitya Akademi Award for English poetry
 Jeet Thayil (born 1959), poet, novelist, editor, winner of Sahitya Akademi Award and first Indian to win DSC Prize
 Kamala Das also known as "Kamala Suraiya" (born 1934), writer and poet in English and Malayalam
 Keki Daruwalla (born 1937), winner of Padma Shri and Sahitya Akademi Award winner for English poetry
 K. V. Dominic (born 1956), poet, short story writer, critic and editor
 Makarand Paranjape (born 1960), poet writing in English
 Mani Rao (born 1965), poet writing in English
 Meena Alexander (1951-2018), poet, scholar and writer in English, Distinguished Professor of English at Hunter College 
 Meena Kandasamy (born 1984), writer, poet, translator and activist
 Michael Madhusudan Dutt (1824–1873), poet and dramatist
 Nissim Ezekiel (1924–2004), poet, playwright and art critic and editor writing in English
 Nalini Priyadarshni (1974), poet, writer, and critic in English
 Nandini Sahu (1973), feminist poet, writer, and critic writing in English
 Neelam Saxena Chandra (born 1969), poet, author, novelist writing in English and Hindi
 P. Lal (1929–2010), poet, translator, professor and publisher; founder and publisher of Writers Workshop in Calcutta, India
 P C K Prem (born 1945), poet, critic and author writing in Hindi and English 
 Pritish Nandy (born 1951), poet, journalist, politician, television personality and film producer writing in English
 R. Parthasarathy, poet, translator, critic, and editor writing in English
 Rochelle Potkar, fiction writer and poet
 Raman Mundair, poet, writer, artist and playwright writing in English
 Yuyutsu Sharma (born 1960), poet, editor and translator, writes in English
 Ranjit Hoskote (born 1969), poet, art critic, cultural theorist and independent curator writing in English
 Robin S Ngangom, poet writing in English
 Rukmini Bhaya Nair, poet and theorist, writing in English
 Salik Shah, poet, author, editor and publisher in English
 Sarojini Naidu (1879–1949), eminent poet, freedom fighter and administrator writing in English
 Shahzad A. Rizvi (born 1937, Gwalior), author, scholar and poet writing in English and Urdu
 Shiv Kumar, poet, playwright, novelist, short story writer
 Shreekumar Varma (born 1955), newspaper columnist, poet, novelist writing in English
 Smita Agarwal (born 1958), poet, critic, educator, and singer
 Som Ranchan (born 1932), poet and novelist writing in English
 Sri Aurobindo (Sri Ôrobindo, 1872–1950), poet, philosopher, and yogi writing in English and French
 Subhash Misra (born 1955)
 Sudeep Sen, poet and editor writing in English
 Tabish Khair (born 1966), poet, novelist and essayist
 Tapan Kumar Pradhan (born 1972), activist, poet, writer; winner of Sahitya Akademi Golden Jubilee Award for poetry
 Tishani Doshi (born 1975), internationally acclaimed poet; first ever Indian to win Forward Poetry Prize
 T.K. Doraiswamy (Nakulan (1921–2007), poet, novelist, translator and professor of English
 T. Vasudeva Reddy (born 1943), poet, novelist, critic and professor of English
 Toru Dutt (1856–1877), poet, wrote in English and French
 Vihang A. Naik (born 1969), poet and educator writing in English and Gujarati.
 Vikram Seth (born 1952), award winning novelist and poet writing in English.

Gujarati

In alphabetical order by last name:

 Akho (1591–1659), poet, Vedantist and radical
 Adil Mansuri (1936–2008), Gujarati poet from Gujarat, India
 Niranjan Bhagat (born 1926), Gujarati poet
 Anil Chavda (born 1985), Gujarati language poet, writer and columnist from Gujarat
 Ashok Chavda (born 1978), Gujarati language poet, writer and critic from Gujarat
 Pir Sadardin, fourteenth-century Ismaili Da'i; regarded as the founder of the Khoja Ismaili sect; also called Satpanth
 Dalpatram (1820–1898), father of Nanalal Dalpatram Kavi
 Dayaram (1777–1853), Gujarati poet of medieval Gujarati literature
 Dileep Jhaveri (born 1943), poet, translator and editor from Mumbai
 Mahadev Desai (1892–1942), writer in English, Gujarati and Bengali
 Suresh Joshi (1921–1986), novelist, short-story writer, critic, poet and writer
 Umashankar Joshi – see listing under "Umashankar", below
 Kalapi (1874–1900), poet and the royal of Lathi state in Gujarat
 Kavi Kant (1867–1923), writer and poet in Gujarati
 Nanalal Dalpatram Kavi (નાનાલાલ દલપતરામ કવિ)
 Jhaverchand Meghani (1896–1947), novelist, poet, short-story writer, folklorist in Gujarati
 Narsinh Mehta, alternate spelling Narasingh Mehta (c. 1414 – c. 1481)
 Chinu Modi (1939–2017), Gujarati poet from Gujarat, India
 Manhar Modi, Gujarati poet from Gujarat, India
 K. M. Munshi (1887–1971), novelist, playwright, writer, politician and lawyer
 Narmad (1834–1886), Gujarati poet, playwright, essayist and reformer during British India
 Vihang A. Naik (born 1969), writes poetry in Gujarati and English
 Ravji Patel (born 1939), modernist poet and novelist in Gujarati
 Rajendra Shah (born 1913), Gujarati poet and Jnanpith Award winner
 Rajendra Shukla, Gujarati poet
 Sundaram (1909–1990), poet, short-story writer, travel writer, biographer and critic
 Govardhanram Tripathi (1855–1907), novelist and poet
 Umashankar Joshi (1911–1988), novelist, poet, playwright, writer and academic; surname: Umashankar, Jnanpith Award winner
 Sitanshu Yashaschandra (born 1941), Gujarati language poet and playwright

Hindi

 Abdul Rahim Khan-I-Khana (1556–1627), composer, poet, and produced books on astrology
 Amir Khusrow (1253–1325), musician, scholar and poet
 Ashok Chakradhar (1951– ), author and poet
 Banarsidas (1586–1643), poet, businessman
 Bihari (1595–1663), poet, author
 Bhikhari Das (1721–?), poet
 Bharatendu Harishchandra (1850–1885), novelist, poet, playwright
 Bhawani Prasad Mishra (1913–1985), poet and author
 Dharmveer Bharti (1926–1997), poet, author, playwright and social thinker
 Dushyant Kumar (1933–1975)
 Gulzar (1934– ), poet, lyricist, film director 
 Geet Chaturvedi (1977– ), poet, short story author and journalist
 Gopal Singh Nepali (1911–1963), poet of Hindi literature and lyricist of Bollywood
 Gopaldas Neeraj (1924– ), poet and author
 Gulab Khandelwal (1924– ), poetry including some in Urdu and English
 Harivansh Rai Bachchan (1907–2003), poet of Chhayavaad literary movement (romantic upsurge)
 Hemant Shesh (1952– ), writer, poet and civil servant
 Hith Harivansh Mahaprabhu (1502–1552), bhakti Braj Bhasha poet-sant and religious leader
 Jagdish Gupt (1924–2001), Chhayavaad literary movement poet
 Jaishankar Prasad (1889–1937), novelist, playwright, poet
 Javed Akhtar (1945– ), poet, lyricist and scriptwriter
 Jumai Khan Azad (1930–2013), poet
 Jwalamukhi (1938–2008), poet, novelist, writer and political activist
 Kabir (1440–1518), mystic poet and saint of India
 Kavi Bhushan (1613–1712), poet and scholar
 Kaka Hathrasi (1906–1995), satirist and humorist poet
 Kedarnath Agarwal (1911–2000), Hindi language poet and littérateur
 Kedarnath Singh (1934– ), poet, critic and essayist
 Keshavdas (1555–1617), best known for his Rasik Priya, a pioneering work of the riti kaal
 Kripalu Maharaj (1922–2013), spiritual master and poet
 Krishan Kumar Sharma "Rasik" (1983– ), Hindi, Punjabi, English and Urdu poet and writer
 Kumar Vishwas (1970– ), poet and professor
 Kunwar Narayan (1927– ), poet
 Kanwal Ziai (1927–2011)
 Mahadevi Varma (1906–1987), poet, woman's activist and educationist
 Maithili Sharan Gupt (1886–1964), poet, politician, dramatist, translator
 Makhanlal Chaturvedi (1889–1968), Indian poet, writer, essayist, playwright and journalist
 Meera (1498–1547), mystic singer and composer of Bhajans
 Mohan Rana (1964– ), poet
 Murari Lal Sharma Neeras (1936– ), poet and educator
 Naresh Mehta, poet and playwright
 Nagarjun (1911–1998), poet, writer, essayist, novelist
 Nawal Kishore Dhawal (1911–1964), writer, poet, proofreader, editor, critic, journalist and author
 Neelam Saxena Chandra (b 1969), poet, writer, novelist
 Padma Sachdev, poet, novelist (Hindi and Dogri language)
 Parichay Das, writer and editor and contemporary Bhojpuri poetry
 Pawan Karan (1964– ), poet, writer, editor, and journalist
 Prasoon Joshi (1971– ), poet, lyricist
 Rambhadracharya (1950– )[β], Hindu religious leader, educator, Sanskrit scholar, polyglot, poet, author, textual commentator, philosopher, composer, singer, playwright and Katha artist
 Ramdhari Singh Dinkar (1908–1974), poet, essayist and academic
 Ramesh Chandra Jha (1925–1994 ), poet, novelist and freedom fighter
 Rustam Singh (born 1955), poet, philosopher, translator and editor
 Ravindra Prabhat (1969– ), author and poet
 Sachchidananda Vatsyayan (1911–1987), poet, writer, novelist, journalist, traveller
 Sahir Ludhianvi, lyricist, poet from Punjab (Ludhiana)
 Shahnaz Fatmi (1949–), poet, writer, essayist, novelist
 Shivmangal Singh Suman (1915–2002), poet and academician
 Shail Chaturvedi (1936–2007), poet, humorist, lyricist, actor
 Sri Lal Sukla (1925–2011), author, writer
 Subhadra Kumari Chauhan (1904–1948), poet
 Sudama Panday 'Dhoomil' (1936–1975), poet 
 Sūdan (1700–1753), poet, writer
 Sumitranandan Pant (1900–1975), Chhayavaad poetry, verse plays and essays
 Suryakant Tripathi 'Nirala' (1899–1961), poet, novelist, essayist and story-writer
 Suryakumar Pandey (Born 1954), poet, writer
 Surdas (1467–1583), composer and devotional poet
 Tara Singh, poet
 Teji Grover (born 1955), Hindi poet, fiction writer, translator and painter
 Tulsidas (1532–1623), poet-saint, reformer and philosopher
 Tribhuvan (born 1964), poet, writer, and journalist
 Uday Prakash (1952– ), scholar, poet, journalist, translator and short story writer
 Valmiki, poet-saint, author of the epic Ramayana
 Virendra Kumar Baranwal (born 1941), Indian poet and writer
 Vrind (1643–1723), poet

Kannada

A. K. Ramanujan (1929–1993), poet and scholar of Indian literature who wrote in Kannada and English
Kuvempu (1904–1994)
D. R. Bendre (1896–1981)
Gopalakrishna Adiga (1918–1992)
V. K. Gokak (1909–1992)
K. S. Narasimhaswamy (1915–2003)
U. R. Ananthamurthy (1932–2014)
Adikavi Pampa (902–975)
Ranna (949-?)
Janna (13th century)
Harihara
Vaidehi (1945– )
D. V. Gundappa (1887–1975)
Purandara Dasa (1484–1564)
Kanaka Dasa (1509–1609)
M. Govinda Pai (1883–1963)
Dinakara Desai (1909–1982)
Gangadevi (14th century)
Gourish Kaikini (1912–2002)
Kumara Vyasa (late 14th-early 15th century)
Akka Mahadevi (1130–1160)
Nagavarma I (late 10th-early 11th century)
Nagavarma II (late 11th-early 12th century)
T. N. Srikantaiah (1906–1966)
B. M. Srikantaiah (1884–1946)
G. S. Shivarudrappa (1926–2013)
Allama Prabhu (12th century)
Shishunala Sharif (1819–1889)
Sarvajna (16th century)
K. S. Nissar Ahmed (1936– )
Masti Venkatesha Iyengar
Gorur Ramaswamy Iyengar 
Raghavendra Swami (belongs to Kannada Madhva Brahmin; born in 1595 or 1598 or 1601 CE)
Devanur Mahadeva (1948 Devanuru village Nanjangud taluk, Mysore district, Karnataka)
Sri Ponna (born 9th to 10th century)
Kayyar Kinhanna Rai (1915 to 2015)
Raghavanka (12th century)
Rudrabhatta (12th century)
Palkuriki Somanatha (1195)
Kesiraja (13th century)

Kashmiri

 Allama Muhammad Iqbal
 Abdul Ahad Azad (1903–1948)
 Agha Shahid Ali
 Amin Kamil (1924–2014)
 Arnimal (died 1800)
 Ghulam Ahmad Mahjur (1885–1952)
 Habba Khatun (16th century)
 Lalleshwari, also known as "Lalla" or "Lal Ded"
 Mahmud Gami (1765–1855)
 Maqbool Shah Kralawari (1820–1976)
 Nund Reshi (1377–1440)
 Rasul Mir (died 1870)
 Rehman Rahi (1925–2023), poet, translator and critic
 Rupa Bhavani (1621–1721)
 Zinda Kaul 'Masterji' (1884–1965)
 Hakeem Manzoor (1937–2006)
 Ghulam Nabi Firaq (1922–2016)

Konkani

Balakrishna Bhagwant Borkar (1910–1984), also known as "Baki-baab"
R. V. Pandit, vast poetic production in Konkani, and some in Portuguese
Uday Bhembre
Ramesh Veluskar, prominent and award-winning Konkani poet

Maithili

 Vidyapati, also known as Vidyapati Thakur and called Maithil Kavi Kokil "the poet cuckoo of Maithili" (c. 1352 – c. 1448), Maithili poet and Sanskrit writer
 Rashtrakavi Ramdhari Singh Dinkar, 23 September 1908 – 24 April 1974,poet, essayist, freedom fighter, patriot and academic
 Acharya Ramlochan Saran (1889–1971), littérateur, grammarian, publisher and poet
 Jayamant Mishra (1925–2010), Sanskrit scholar and Maithili poet

Malayalam

Medieval poets

 Thunchaththu Ramanujan Ezhuthachan, called the "Father of the Malayalam language" (fl. 16th century)
 Johann Ernst Hanxleden, also known as "Arnos Paathiri" (1681–1732), German Jesuit priest
 Poonthanam Namboothiri (fl. 16th century), devotional poet
 Kunchan Nambiar (1705–1770)
 Unnayi Warrier
 Irayimman Thampi (1783–1862), court poet and musician
 Moyinkutty Vaidyar (1857–1891)

Renaissance Poets
 Kumaran Asan (1873–1924)
 Kerala Varma Valiya Koyithampuran, also known as Kerala Varma (1845–1914), poet and translator
 Vallathol Narayana Menon (1878–1958)
 Ulloor S Parameswara Iyer (1877–1949)
 K. V. Simon (1883–1943)
 K.C. Kesava Pillai (1868–1914)
 A. R. Raja Raja Varma (1863–1918), poet, grammarian, scholar, critic and writer

Romantic Poets
 Changampuzha Krishna Pillai (1911–1948), poet and translator
 Edappalli Raghavan Pillai (1909–1936)
 P. Kunhiraman Nair (1906–1974)
 Sanjayan

Neo-Romantic Poets
 G. Sankara Kurup, aka "Sankara Kurup" (died 1978)
 Vyloppilli Sreedhara Menon, aka "Vailoppilli Sreedhara Menon" (1911–1985)
 Edasseri Govindan Nair (1906–1974))
 N.V. Krishna Warrier (1916–1989), poet and scholar
 Thirunalloor Karunakaran (1924–2006), poet and scholar
 P. Bhaskaran (1924–2007), poet and film songwriter
 Vayalar Ramavarma, also spelled Vayalar Rama Varma (1928–1975)
 O.N.V. Kurup (born 1931)
 Vishnunarayanan Namboothiri (born 1939)
 Kunjunni (died 2006)
 Balamani Amma
 Sugathakumari

Modernist Poets
 M. Govindan (1919–1988)
 K. Ayyappa Panicker, also spelled Ayyappa Paniker, Indian (1930–2006)
 Attoor Ravi Varma
 Kadammanitta Ramakrishnan, popularly known as Kadammanitta (1935–2008)
 Satchidanandan (born 1946), critic (writing in Malayalam and English), poet (in Malayalam)
 S. Rajasekharan (born 1946), poet and literary critic
 D. Vinayachandran
 A. Ayyappan (born 1949)
 Balachandran Chullikkad (born 1957), poet and actor
 Nellikkal Muraleedharan (born 1948), poet, writer and critic
 Venu V Desom

Postmodern Poets
 P. P. Ramachandran
 T. P. Rajeevan (born 1959), poet, novelist and literary critic.
 V. M. Girija (born 1961), poet
 Veerankutty
 Syam Sudhakar (born 1983), poet and literary critic

Manipuri

 Nongthombam Biren Singh, politician, poet and former journalist
 Ashangbam Minaketan Singh (1906-1995), founder of modern Meitei literature, author of Manipuri epic "Basanta sheireng", winner of Padma Shri, Sahitya Akademi and Soviet Land Nehru Prize
 Robin S Ngangom (born 1959), poet who writes in English and Meiteilon
 Angom Gopi (1710-1780), classical Manipuri poet, translator of Bhagavad Gita and Bible into Meitei language
 Rajkumar Shitaljit Singh (1913-2008), poet, writer and teacher, winner of President's Medal and Sahitya Ratna award
 Elangbam Nilakanta Singh (1927-2000), author of "Tirtha Yatra" and "Manipuri Sheirang"; winner of Padma Shri and Sahitya Akademi Award

Marathi

Samarth Ramdas, wrote Manache Shlok; known as the Guru of Shivaji Maharaj
Sant Dnyaneshwar, also known as "Sant Jñāneshwar" and "Jñanadeva" (1275–1296), saint, poet, philosopher and yogi
Eknath or Eknāth (1533–1599), poet and scholar
Tukaram (birth-year estimates range from 1577–-1609 – died 1650)
Keshav Pandit, also known as Keshav Pandit or Keshav Bhat Pandit (died 1690), religious official under Chhatrapati Shivaji, poet and Sanskrit scholar
Raghunath Pandit
Suresh Bhat 1932–2003), known as Ghazal Samrat (Emperor of ghazals) for his exposition of that form
Namdeo Dhasal (born 1949), poet, writer, journalist, editor and Dalit activist
Manohar Oak (born 1933), poet and novelist
Arun Kolatkar (born 1931 or 1932), poet who wrote both in Marathi and English; also a graphic designer
Bahinabai Chaudhari (1880–1951), illiterate poet whose son wrote down her poems for her
Tryambak Bapuji Thombre "Balkavi"
Vilas Sarang (born 1942), writer, critic, translator and poet
Kusumagraj, pen name of Vishnu Vāman Shirwādkar (1912–1999), poet, writer and humanist
P. S. Rege (1910–1978), poet, playwright, fiction writer and academic
Shanta Shelke (1922–2002), poet, journalist, professor, composer, story writer, translator, writer of children's literature
Hemant Divate (born 1967), poet, editor of Abhidhanantar magazine, translator
Hridaynath Mangeshkar (born 1937), eminent poet and composer of songs mainly in Marathi and Hindi
Manya Joshi (born 1972), Marathi poet
Mangesh Narayanrao Kale (born 1966), poet, editor, critic and translator
Saleel Wagh (born 1967), poet, translator, critic
G. D. Madgulkar, popularly known in his home state of Maharashtra by his initials, Ga Di Ma (1919–1977), poet, lyricist, writer and actor; older brother of writer Venkatesh Madgulkar
Poet Borkar, Balakrishna Bhagwant Borkar, also known as "Baki-baab" (1910–1984), wrote mostly in Marathi but with numerous works in Konkani
Vinayak Damodar Savarkar (1883–1966), revolutionary freedom fighter, ideologue and thinker who composed mainly poems and songs of nationalist and revolutionary sentiments
 Varjesh Solanki (born 1967), award-winning Marathi poet
 Vasant Abaji Dahake (born 1942), poet, novelist, playwright, artist, and critic
 Bhau Panchbhai, poet and dalit activist
 Mangesh Padgaonkar (born 1929), Marathi poet and recipient Maharashtra Bhushan Award
 Indira Sant

Nepali
See also: List of Nepali-language poets

 Agam Singh Giri (1927–1971)
Hari Bhakta Katuwal (1935-1980)
Kamala Sankrityayan (1920-2009)
 Parijat (1937–1993)
 Rajendra Bhandari (born 1956)
Salik Shah (his bilingual poetry collection, "Khas Pidgin," won Elgin Award nomination from Science Fiction & Fantasy Poetry Association in 2018)
Tulsiram Sharma 'Kashyap' (1939 – 1998)
 Yuyutsu Sharma (born 1960)

Odia

 Jayadeva (1170-1245), author of the famous Gita Govinda in Sanskrit and some poems in Odia (12th century)
 Sarala Das (15th century AD), author of the Odia Mahabharata in verse (15th century)
 Jagannatha Dasa, author of the Odia Bhagabata and one of the panchasakha (15th century)
 Achyutananda Dasa, author of Sunya Sanghita and multiple other texts, one of the panchasakha (16th century)
 Salabega (born 1607 or 1608), Muslim author of many bhajans and devotee of Jagannath
 Upendra Bhanja (born from 1670 to 1688), poet and member of the royal family of a princely state
 Abhimanyu Samantasinghara, author of Bigadha Chintamani
 Bhima Bhoi (1850–1895), author of Stuti Chintamani, blind Mahima saint poet of Odisha
 Brajanath Badajena (1729-1799), awarded Kabi Bhushana, author of classics like "Samara Taranga" and "Chatura Binoda"
 Brajanath Ratha (1936-2014), poet, writer, social activist, winner of Tagore Award
 Fakir Mohan Senapati (1843–1918), short-story writer, novelist, poet, writer, government official and social activist
 Gangadhar Meher (1862-1924), known as Svabhava Kavi and Prakriti Kavi (Nature Poet), author of "Tapaswini" epic
 Gopabandhu Das (1877-1928), called Utkala Mani ("Gem of Orissa"), social worker, political activist, writer, novelist and poet
 Jayanta Mahapatra (born 1928), winner of Padma Shri and Sahitya Akademi Award
 Krushna Chandra Kar
 Manasi Pradhan
 Manmohan Acharya
 Nanda Kishore Bal (1875-1928), known as Palli Kavi (Poet of Rural Life), penned popular lyrics for children called "Nana Baya Geeta"
 Nirmala Devi
 Radhanath Ray (1848-1908), known as Kabibar (Supreme Poet), author of epics like "Chilika", "Chandrabhaga", "Mahajatra" and "Kedara Gouri"
 Sitakanta Mohapatra (born 1937), winner of Padma Bhusan, Padma Vibhusan, Sahitya Akademi, Jnanpith Award and Tagore Award
 Ramakrushna Nanda (1906-1994), eminent writer of children's literature, author of the morning prayer song "Ahe Dayamaya Vishwa Vihari" sung in all Odia schools
 Pratibha Satpathy (born 1945), poet, editor and winner of Sahitya Akademi Award
 Ramakant Rath (born 1934), author of epic "Shri Radha", winner of Padma Bhusan, Saraswati Samman and Sahitya Akademi Fellowship
 Tapan Kumar Pradhan (born 1972), author of Kalahandi and winner of Sahitya Akademi Golden Jubilee Award
 Sachidananda Routray (1916-2004), winner of Jnanapith Award, author of "Baji Rout", "Pratima Nayak", "Pallishri" and "Chhota Mora Gaan"
 Rabi Singh (1931-2020), freedom fighter and Marxist writer of revolutionary poems
 Upendra Bhanja (1670-1740), known as Kavi Samrat (King of Poets), author of epics like "Vaideheesha Vilasa", "Prema Sudhanidhi", "Lavanyavati" etc

Punjabi

 Baba Farid (12th–13th century)
 Damodar Das Arora (1605-1656 AD)
 Shah Hussain (16th century)
 Sultan Bahu (16th–17th century)
 Saleh muhammad safoori (17th century)
 Bulleh Shah (17th–18th century)
 Waris Shah (18th century)
 Khwaja Ghulam Farid (18th–19th century)
 Mian Muhammad Bakhsh (19th century)
 Qadaryar (19th century)
 Peelu (19th century)
 Hashim (19th century)
 Shareef Kunjahi (20th century)
 Mir Tanha Yousafi (20th century)
 Anwar Masood (20th century)
 Afzal Ahsan Randhawa (20th century)
 Aatish (20th century)
 Shaista Nuzhat –(20th century)
 Bhai Veer Singh (20th century)
 Jaswant Singh Rahi (20th century)
 Dhani Ram Chatrik (20th century)
 Faiz Ahmad Faiz (20th century)
 Amrita Pritam (20th century)
 Darshan Singh Awara (20th century)
 Dr. Harbhajan Singh (20th century)
 Shiv Kumar Batalvi (20th century)
 Sharif Kunjahi (20th century)
 Paash (20th century)
 Surjit Paatar (20th century)
 Ajmer Rode (20th century)
 Sukhdarshan Dhaliwal
 Satinder Sartaj 
 Balwant Gargi
 Sukhbir
 Shardha Ram Phillauri
 Ustad Daman
 Munir Niazi

Rajasthani

Medieval
 Dursa Arha (1535 – 1655), 'First Nationalist Poet Of India' 16th-century warrior and Rajasthani poet
 Suryamal Misran (1815 – 1868), 19th century Rajkavi (State Poet & Historian) of Bundi State
 Mahatma Isardas (1539 – 1618), Rajasthani saint-poet
 Narharidas Barhath (1648 – 1733), Rajasthani saint-poet
 Brahmanand Swami (1772 – 1832), saint of the Swaminarayan Sampraday and as one of Swaminarayan's Paramahamsa
 Chand Bardai, Court poet of Prithvi Raj Chauhan
 Kaviraj Bankidas Asiya, 18th-century Raj-Kavi (State Poet & Historian) of Jodhpur State
 Kanhaiyalal Sethia (1919 – 2008), Rajasthani and Hindi poet
 Sanwar Daiya
 Sawai Singh Dhamora (1926 – 2017)
 Kriparam Khidiya, author of "Rajiya ra Sortha"
 Fateh Karan Charan, Rajasthani poet & leader of the Bijolia Movement
 Lakshmi Kumari Chundawat (1916 – 2014), Indian author and politician
 Shakti Dan Kaviya (1940 – 2021), Sahitya Akademi Award recipient- poet, writer, and scholar of Rajasthani, Dingal, Brajbhasha, & Hindi
 Narayan Singh Bhati (1930 – 1994), founder of Rajasthani Research Institute (Chopasani, Jodhpur)
 Vijaydan Detha (1926 – 2013), Padma Shri & Sahitya Akademi Award recipient noted Rajasthani poet & writer 
 Arjun Deo Charan (born 1954), Rajasthani poet, critic, playwright, theatre director and translator
 Chandra Prakash Deval, Rajasthani poet and translator, convener of Rajasthani Advisory Council of Sahitya Akademi.
 Bhanwar Singh Samaur (born 1943),  Sahitya Akademi Award recipient, writer, poet, historian, and social worker
 Kaviraja Shyamaldas (19th century), Rajkavi (State Poet & Historian) of Udaipur State
 Swarupadas (1801–1863), Dadu Panthi poet
 Thakur Akshay Singh Ratnu (1910 – 1995), Rajasthani, Brajbhasha and Hindi poet 
 Thakur Kesari Singh Barhath (1872–1941), Indian revolutionary leader & poet

Sanskrit

Ancient poets
 Valmiki, author of Ramayana
 Vedavyasa, author of Mahabharata Ashtadasapurana

Classical poets
 Kālidāsa, Classical Sanskrit poet and dramatist writer of Kumara Sambhavam, Meghadootam, abhignana shakuntalam
 Adi Sankara, author of a lot of poems; Bhaja Govindam, Soundarya Lahari, Eulogy on Brahma sutrams, Bhagavathgita Bhashyam and Lalitha Sahasranama
 Bharavi, author of Kiratarjuniya
 Magha
 Bhatti, author of Bhattikāvya, known as Rāvatavadha

Medieval poets
 Jayadeva (1200 AD), author of Gita Govinda
 Narayana Panditacharya, author of Sumadhvavijaya, Sangraha Ramayana
 Vedanta Desika (1269–1370), Sri Vaishnava writer, poet, devotee, philosopher and teacher

Early modern poets
 Kavikalanidhi Devarshi Shrikrishna Bhatt (1675–1761), court poet of Jai Singh II
 Krishnadevaraya (died 1529), king of the Vijayanagara empire and poet
 Prabodhananda Sarasvati (16th century), Vaishnava bhakti poet-saint
 Vadiraja Tirtha (1480–1600), Dvaita saint, poet, devotee and philosopher

Modern Poets

 Jagadguru Rāmabhadrācārya
 Ram Karan Sharma, of New Delhi
 Srinivas Rath (1943-2014), Sahitya Akademi Award winner and founder of Kalidasa Akademi 
 Vanikavi Manomohan Acharya, Cuttack
 Pandhareenathachar Galagali
 Rama Kant Shukla (born 1940), winner of Padma Shri, Kalidasa Samman, Sahitya Akademi Award
 Shridhar Bhaskar Warnekar (1918-2007), winner of Kalidasa Samman and Sahitya Akademi Award

Sindhi

 Moti Prakash

Tamil

Sangam poets (c. 300 BC to 300 AD)
 Agastya
 Avvaiyar, the name of more than one poet who was active during different periods of Tamil literature; Auvaiyar I lived during the Sangam period (c. 1st and 2nd century CE)
 Kadiyalur Uruttirangannanar
 Kapilar

see also Sangam literature

Post-Sangam poets (200 AD to 1000 AD)
 Thiruvalluvar ([fl.] c. 2nd – 8th century AD), poet who wrote the Thirukkural, an ethical work
 Ilango Adigal (300 to 700 AD), wrote the epic Cilappathikaaram
 Nakkeerar (fl. c. 9th century)
 Sīthalai Sāttanār
 Tirutakkatevar

Bakthi period poets (700 to 1700 AD)
 Manikkavacakar
 63 Nayanars, namely Appar, Sambanthar, Sundarar etc.
 12 Alvars, namely Poigaialvar, Boothathaalvaar etc.
 Sekkizhar (fl. 12th century), poet and scholar
 Kambar
 Ottakoothar
 Arunagirinathar
 Pattinathar
 Siva Prakasar

Patriots and British period poets
 Anandabharati Aiyangar (1786–1846)
 Henry Alfred Krishnapillai (1827–1900, author of Ratchanya Yaatrigam)
 Subramanya Bharathi called Mahakavi Bharati ("Great Poet Bharati") (1882–1921) poet, writer, independence advocate and reformer
 Subramanya Siva (1884–1925), poet and independence advocate
 Bharathidasan, also spelled Bharatidasan (1891–1964), poet, playwright, screenwriter, short-story writer and essayist
 Kavimani Desigavinayagam Pillai
 Sheikh Thambi Pavalar
 Ramalinga Swamigal

Modern
 Perunchithiranar (1933–1995), poet and philosopher 
 Kannadasan (1927–1981), poet and song lyrics writer
 Vaali (1931–2013), poet and song lyrics writer
 Annamalai Reddiyar, Tamil poet
 Vairamuthu, poet and song lyrics writer
 Pudhumaipithan
 T. K. Doraiswamy ("Nakulan")
 Prof. Karmegha Konar
 P. Vijay, poet who writes song lyrics for films
 Mu. Metha, poet and songwriter
 L. S. Kandasamy
 V. Akilesapillai (1853–1910), Sri Lankan scholar, poet and writer
 Perumal Rasu, poet, writer, painter and spiritual master
 Manushyaputhiran

Telugu

Medieval poets
 Nannaya Bhattaraka, also known as the First Poet "Aadi Kavi", the first poet of the Kavi Trayam, or "Trinity of Poets", that translated Mahabharatamu into Telugu over the course of a few centuries
 Tikkana also called "Tikkana Somayaji" (1205–1288), poet and member of Kavi Trayam
 Errana also known as "Yellapregada" or "Errapregada" (fl. 14th century).
 Gona Budda Reddy – 13th-century poet
 Annamacharya (1408–1503), mystic saint composer of the 15th century, widely regarded as the Telugu pada kavita pitaamaha (grand old man of simple poetry); husband of Tallapaka Tirumalamma
 Sri Krishnadevaraya, Vijayanagar Emperor, Telugu language patron, Telugu language poet
Allasani Peddana, 15th century poet and known as foremost of Asthadiggajas (Eight elite Telugu poets under Sri Krishnadevaraya)
Nandi Thimmana, a member of Ashtadiggajas 
Madayyagari Mallana, a member of Ashtadiggajas 
Dhurjati, a member of Ashtadiggajas 
Ayyalaraju Ramambhadrudu, a member of Ashtadiggajas 
Pingali Surana, a member of Ashtadiggajas 
Ramarajabhushanudu, a member of Ashtadiggajas 
Tenali Ramakrishna, poet, scholar, thinker and a special advisor in the court of Sri Krishnadevaraya, nicknamed Vikatakavi
 Molla, also known as "Mollamamba", both popular names of Atukuri Molla (1440–1530), poet who wrote Telugu Ramayan; a woman
 Potana, born Bammera Pothana (1450–1510), poet best known for his translation of the Bhagavata Purana from Sanskrit; the book is popularly known as Pothana Bhagavatham
Tallapaka Tirumalamma, also known as "Timmakka" and "Thimmakka" (fl. 15th century), poet who wrote Subhadra Kalyanam; wife of singer-poet Annamacharya and was popularly known as Timmakka
 Vemana (fl. 14th century), poet
 Bhadrachala Ramadasu, 17th-century Indian devotee of Lord Rama and a composer of Carnatic music.
Rennaissance poets
 Kandukuri Veeresalingam (1848–1919), social reformer, poet, scholar, founded the journal Vivekavardhani, introduced the essay, biography, autobiography and the novel into Telugu literature
Gurajada Apparao (1862–1915), poet, writer and playwright who wrote the first Telugu play, Kanyasulkam; also an influential social reformer sometimes called Mahakavi ("the great poet")
 Gurram Jashuva (1895–1971), a dalit poet and writer and producer of All India Radio, awarded "Padma Bhushan" by the Govt of India, known for poetry on social evils
 Sri Sri, Srirangam Srinivasa Rao (1910–1983), marxist poet notable for his work Maha Prasthanam
 Jwalamukhi, pen name of Veeravalli Raghavacharyulu (1938–2008), poet, novelist, writer and political activist 
 Viswanatha Satyanarayana (1895–1976), popularly known as the Kavi Samraat ("Emperor of Poetry")
 Balijepalli Lakshmikantham (1881–1953), poet and dramatist
 Chellapilla Venkata Sastry, poet and scholar
 Devulapalli Krishna Sastry (1887–1981), poet and writer of radio plays, known as "Andhra Shelly"
 Devarakonda Balagangadhara Tilak
 Divakarla Tirupati Sastry
 Rayaprolu Subba Rao
 C. R. Reddy
Modern poets
 C. Narayana Reddy (born 1931), poet, academic and songwriter
 Aarudhra, pen name of Bhagavatula Siva Sankara Sastry (1925–1998), author, poet, essayist, writer of stories (including detective stories), playwright, translator, composer of film songs
 Ismail, popular name of Mohammad Ismail (born 1928)
 Suravaram Pratap Reddy, writer and historian from Telangana
 Kethu Viswanatha Reddy, poet from Rayalaseema
 Gunturu Seshendra Sarma (1927–2007), also known as Yuga Kavi
 Papineni Sivasankar, poet and critic from Andhra Pradesh
 Sirivennela Sitaramasastri, popular poet and lyricist

Urdu
In alphabetical order by last name:

Maghfoor Ahmad Ajazi (1900-1966), poet, writer, orator and prominent Indian freedom fighter from Muzaffarpur, Bihar
Javed Akhtar (born 1945) Eminent lyricist and script writer for movies.
Mir Babar Ali Anis
Kaifi Azmi
Bashir Badr (born 1935), eminent Ghazal writer, winner of Padma Shri, Sangeet Natak Akademi and Sahitya Akademi awards
Mirza Ghalib (1797-1869), world famous Ghazal writer from Mughal Era
Raza Naqvi Wahi, poet from Patna, Bihar
Shahnaz Fatmi (1949–), poet, writer from Patna, Bihar
Rafiq Husain
Rahat Indori (1950-2020), famous Bollywood lyricist
Masud Husain Khan
Syed Mahmood "Talib" Khundmiri
Syed Hasnain Raza Naqvi
Irfan Nasirabadi
Nazish Pratapgarhi
Shahzad A. Rizvi (born 1937), author, scholar and poet
Iftikhar Imam Siddiqui
Kanwal Ziai
Mir Taqi Mir

See also

Indian poetry
List of Indian English poetry anthologies

References

Lists of poets by nationality